Christopher James "Chris" Harper (born December 7, 1993) is an American gridiron football wide receiver who is currently playing for the Montreal Alouettes of the Canadian Football League. He was signed by the New England Patriots as an undrafted free agent following the 2015 NFL Draft. He played college football at California.

College
Harper was Cal's most productive receiver over his 35 games played and 23 starts during his three seasons with the program from 2012–14. He entered the 2015 NFL draft as an underclassman, forgoing his final season of eligibility.

Professional career

New England Patriots
Harper went undrafted, but signed with the New England Patriots on May 5, 2015 as an undrafted free agent. Harper made the Patriots initial 53-man roster and played in the first game of the 2015 season but was cut by the team on September 15, 2015. Harper was resigned to the Patriots' practice squad on September 17, 2015. On November 17, 2015, following an injury to Julian Edelman, the Patriots signed Harper from the practice squad to the 53-man roster.

On November 30, 2015, the Patriots waived Harper after a costly muffed punt in the snow against the Denver Broncos the day before. On December 2, 2015, the New England Patriots signed Harper to the practice squad. On December 26, the Patriots again promoted Harper to the 53-man roster.

On January 3, 2016, Harper caught his first pass for 6 yards against the Miami Dolphins.

On September 3, 2016, Harper was released by the Patriots as part of final roster cuts.

San Francisco 49ers
On September 5, 2016, Harper was signed to the San Francisco 49ers practice squad. On September 12, 2016, he was promoted to the active roster. The next day, he was released by the 49ers and was re-signed to the teams' practice squad the following day. Harper was promoted back to the active roster on November 8, 2016. On May 2, 2017, Harper was waived by the 49ers.

New York Jets 
Harper was signed by the New York Jets on May 30, 2017. He was waived on September 1, 2017.

Toronto Argonauts
Harper was signed by the Toronto Argonauts on April 12, 2018.

References

External links
 Toronto Argonauts bio

1993 births
Living people
California Golden Bears football players
People from Encino, Los Angeles
Players of American football from Los Angeles
American football wide receivers
New England Patriots players
San Francisco 49ers players
New York Jets players
Canadian football wide receivers
Montreal Alouettes players
Players of Canadian football from Los Angeles